Global Hands-On Universe (GHOU) is an educational program that enables students to investigate the Universe while applying tools and concepts from science, math, and technology. Using the Internet, GHOU participants request observations from an automated telescope, download images from an image archive, and analyze them with the help of image processing software.

History
The International Astronomical Union (IAU) launched the Galileo Teacher Training Program (GTTP) in 2009. GHOU is a major component of GTTP.

In Asia, the AS-HOU section is represented by China and Japan. In Africa, AF-HOU is represented by Kenya, which recently launched pilot project at Kenya High in Nairobi. The research-based astronomy and astrophysics curriculum aims to introduce scientific research methodologies into secondary education.

In Europe, the Hands-On Universe project is led by Dr. Ferlet and Dr A.-L. Melchior. EU-HOU has been funded through the European Community (EC) program MINERVA (SOCRATES) for a two-year period (2004–2006), and through the European Community (EC) program COMENIUS (LifeLong Learning Program) for two two-year periods (2008–2010, 2010–2012). EU-HOU has extended to 15 EC countries, with national websites. The Pierre and Marie Curie University in Paris is the educational center for the EU-HOU project. The EU-HOU project has developed numerous free pedagogical resources that are available on the project's website. They include: (1) the multilingual SalsaJ software, which enables secondary school pupils to handle astronomical data and analyse them. An exercise series based on this software has been developed. Associated data can be downloaded directly from the software. (2) The EUHOUMW Small Radiotelescope Network developed in the framework of the Comenius project "Connecting classrooms to the Milky Way" enables secondary school pupils to access the instruments installed in five different European countries (France, Poland, Portugal, Romania, Spain). Children can observe the hydrogen from the Milky Way with these 3-metres radiotelescopes. Every operation can be performed from the Web interface, available in 17 different languages, which enables the learners to reconstruct the rotation curve of the Milky Way as well as its spiral arms. Pedagogical resources (teacher's manual, simulator of observation, archives, kinesthetic activities) have been tested in teacher's training, secondary school level, and also at the undergraduate level.

In North America, the US HOU project is led by the United States with support from the National Science Foundation, the Department of Defense, and the Department of Energy. In the US, HOU has developed and pilot-tested an educational program that enables high school students to request their own observations from professional observatories. Students download telescope images to their classroom computers and use the powerful HOU image processing software to visualize and analyze their data. The High school curriculum developed by HOU integrates many of the science and math topics and skills outlined in national standards into open-ended astronomical investigations. HOU has also developed activities and tools for middle school students and products for informal science education centers. The Lawrence Hall of Science at The University of California, Berkeley, is the educational center for the HOU project.

Teacher training sessions 
In the context of the European Commission Lifelong Learning Programme 2007–2013, EU-HOU proposes regular European training sessions in France, at Pierre-and-Marie-Curie University in Paris, since 2010. These sessions are published on the Comenius training database (reference numbers: FR-2010-314-003, FR-2011-359-006, FR-2013-408-003).

The main goal of these training sessions is to generate interest in science in the young generation with inquiry-based methods. Active methods based e.g. on kinesthesia (Proprioception) have been recently introduced to introduce modeling concepts. The training is intended to enhance the basic competencies of teachers and develop higher-level skills and expertise, primarily in Information and communication technologies in education (ICT), maths and physics areas.

These sessions are financed through European Commission Comenius national Agencies (Comenius programme). Information related to scheduled training sessions is posted on the EU-HOU website and its news.

A dedicated forum in English has been opened to favour feedback from trained teachers and interaction with a wider educator and researcher community.

See also
 Global Science Opera
 List of astronomical societies

References

External links 
 Official site of Global Hands-On Universe GHOU
 Official site of European Hands-On Universe EU-HOU
 Official site of US Hands-On Universe US HOU
 Official site of Asian Hands-On Universe AS-HOU
 Official site of Spanish Hands-On Universe HOU-Spain
 Official site for Teachers training sessions registering

Science education
Amateur astronomy organizations